Myriam Gendron is a Quebecois musician and songwriter living and working in Montreal.

Biography
Myriam Gendron was born in Ottawa. She spent part of her childhood and adolescence in Gatineau, in Paris, and in Washington, D.C.

In 2014, her first album Not So Deep as a Well set poems by Dorothy Parker to music. Two other poems by Parker were also set to music and released in 2015: “Bric-à-brac” and “The Small Hours”.

A second album was released in 2021, titled Ma Délire. Songs of Love, Lost and Found and largely oriented around her contemporary interpretations of popular Canadian music. It notably includes “Au cœur de ma délire”, a traditional song first popularized by Dominique Tremblay and Philippe Gagnon, two members of Robert Charlebois’s touring entourage . It also includes a version of “Par un dimanche au soir”, and “Le tueur de femmes”. The song “Poor Girl Blues” is an interpolation of “Un Canadien errant”. The album also includes her interpretations of several traditional songs from other cultures, such as “Go Away From My Window”, a traditional American folk song collected by John Jacob Niles, and songs with more complex histories, such as “Shenandoah”, an American sea shanty dating from the early nineteenth century with French-Canadian origins.

“Literature is a passion for me, and in folk music I’ve found a literary form that suits me well”, she explains, adding: “I love all kinds of music: alternative music, metal… I like when it rips, and folk is not incompatible with that.” She also works as a bookseller in Montreal.

Discography 
 2014: Not So Deep as a Well, Feeding Tube Records, Mama Bird Recording Co.
 2015: Bric-à-brac / The Small Hours, Feeding Tube Records, L'Oie de Cravan Records
 2021: Ma Délire. Songs of Love, Lost and Found, Feeding Tube Records, les albums claus

References

Canadian women folk singers
Year of birth missing (living people)
Living people